Korowai may refer to:
Korowai people
Korowai language
Korowai (cloak), a type of traditional Māori cloak

Language and nationality disambiguation pages